The Olukwumi people are Igbo people with Yoruba ancestry. A subgroup of the Igbo people of the Aniocha North area of the Delta State, Nigeria.

The Olukwumi occupy eight communities west of the Niger river, and are together known today as the Odiani Clan in Aniomaland. Ukwu Nzu (Eko Efun) town is the historical headquarters of the Olukwumi people and is traditionally headed by the Obi of Ukwu Nzu, Agbogidi. The present Obi is H.R.M. Obi Ogoh 1. Olukwumi villages select leaders through the Okpala Obi system, which is the Okpala (gerontocracy) of the Igbo. The Anioma people are the Igbo subgroup from Aniocha (Enuani and Olukwumi), Ndokwa (Ukwuani), Ika, and Oshimili areas of Delta State.

Geography
The Olukwumi are native to an area just west of the Niger River's right bank. The area is rich in Chalk and Kaolin deposits which is known as "Nzu" in Igbo language and "Efun" in Yoruba, which has been traditionally mined and used by the people of the area for various cultural purposes.

Etymology

The word Olukumi is said by some to mean "My confidant" or "My friend" in Yoruba.

History
According to Olukwumi oral tradition, Olukwumi are is a blend of aboriginal Igbos and migrants from the Owo, Akure or the Akoko, depending on the Olukwumi town in question. 

Due to the subsequent blend and proximity of their settlements with Enuani speakers,  they today speak both the Olukwumi and Enuani dialect dialects of Igbo language. Prayers and recitals in their native dialect are also being encouraged, while making conscious efforts to speak the language to their children and in their communities as a whole.  Of the towns in the Odiani clan, only Ugbodu and Ukwu-Nzu are bilingual; the rest are solely Enuani-speaking.

According to a report in the Sunday Tribune of October 24, 2010, they have also started to organize recitation and oratory quizzes and competitions in Olukwumi to preserve the dialect. Linguists are also documenting the language. For 40 years, Chief G B Nkemnacho, a lawyer of Olukwumi origin has documented his people's history as told by its elders as life experiences and oral tradition.

Olukumi towns and communities

Non-Olukumi villages with Olukumi ancestry

Language

Notable Olukwumi People
Nduka Ugbade - (Former Nigerian football star and coach)
Helen Anyamelune -  (1958' Miss Nigeria)
 Chinedum Mordi - (First Professor from Ugbodu, lectured at Delta State University, Abraka

See also
Yoruba people
Anioma people

References

External links
Olukwumi dictionary

Ethnic groups in Africa
Ethnic groups in Nigeria
Delta State
History of Igboland